Sándor Nagy (born 1 January 1988) is a Hungarian former football player. He has a twin brother named József Nagy, who also is a footballer.

References

External links

1988 births
Twin sportspeople
Hungarian twins
People from Szolnok
Sportspeople from Jász-Nagykun-Szolnok County
Living people
Hungarian footballers
Association football defenders
Ferencvárosi TC footballers
Kecskeméti TE players
Lombard-Pápa TFC footballers
Gyirmót FC Győr players
Ceglédi VSE footballers
Békéscsaba 1912 Előre footballers
Nemzeti Bajnokság I players
Nemzeti Bajnokság II players